In June 1824, John Tod (DR) of  resigned.  A special election was held to fill the resulting vacancy on October 12, 1824, the same day as the elections to the 19th Congress

Election results

Thomson ran unopposed.  He also won the same seat in the 19th Congress

See also
List of special elections to the United States House of Representatives

References

Pennsylvania 1824 13
Pennsylvania 1824 13
1824 13
Pennsylvania 13
United States House of Representatives 13
United States House of Representatives 1824 13
Single-candidate elections